The Sociedad de Salvamento y Seguridad Marítima (literally: Maritime Safety and Rescue Society), also known as SASEMAR or Salvamento Marítimo, is a sea search and rescue agency that operates in Spain. It is the body in charge of maritime traffic control, safety and rescue operations, and protection of the maritime environment but lacks any law enforcement responsibilities. The agency runs 20 rescue coordination centers (RCC), employs a staff of 1,500, and operates a fleet of 19 vessels, 54 boats, 11 helicopters, and 4 airplanes.

Equipment

Tugboats
María de Maeztu class

Luz de Mar class

Don Inda class

Lifeboats
Salvamar class
Guardamar class

Aircraft

8 AgustaWestland AW139 (another 1 crashed)
3 Sikorsky S-61
1 Eurocopter EC225
3 CASA CN-235(4 in order)
3 Cessna 337 Super Skymaster

Aircraft accidents
On 21 January 2010, Spanish Maritime Safety Agency AW-139SAR, crashed into the sea close to Almería. Three of the four on board died.

Gallery

See also
 Société Nationale de Sauvetage en Mer
 German Maritime Search and Rescue Service

References

External links

 

Sea rescue organizations
Government agencies of Spain
1992 establishments in Spain
Organizations established in 1992